Mont Humboldt, or Mount Humboldt is a mountain in New Caledonia, Melanesia, and is the second tallest mountain in the region, being just ten metres short of Mont Panié.

Etymological origins  

Its name is derived from Prussian explorer Alexander von Humboldt.

References

Humboldt